Euseius insanus is a species of mite in the family Phytoseiidae.

References

insanus
Articles created by Qbugbot
Animals described in 1969